Alexander Møller (24 April 1762  – 28 December 1847) was a Norwegian physician who served at the Norwegian Constituent Assembly in 1814.

Alexander Christian Møller was born in Christiania (now Oslo), Norway. In 1792, he took his medical examination at the  University of Copenhagen. He settled the same year as a private doctor in Arendal, where from 1796 to 1835, he was district surgeon in Nedenes amt  (now Aust-Agder).

He represented Arendal at the Norwegian Constituent Assembly at Eidsvoll in 1814. He was elected to the Parliament of Norway in 1814.
Since he was the only doctor at the Assembly, he was summoned when representatives were sick or injured.

References

1762 births
1847 deaths
Physicians from Oslo
University of Copenhagen alumni
19th-century Norwegian physicians
Aust-Agder politicians
Fathers of the Constitution of Norway
Members of the Storting